Johann Nepomuk Sepp (7 August 1816 – 5 June 1909) was a German historian and politician, and a native of Bavaria.

Life
Johann Nepomuk Sepp was born in Bad Tölz, Bavaria, to a tanner and dyer, Josef Bernhard Sepp and his wife Maria Victoria Oefele. He studied philosophy and Catholic theology, law, philology and history in Munich, 1834–1836 and 1837–1839. In 1836, he interrupted his university studies for a trip to Switzerland and Italy, after which he entered the Gregorianum seminary in Munich. In 1839, he was awarded a Ph.D., and established himself as a private scholar in Bad Tölz. From 1844 to 1846, he taught as lecturer at the University of Munich.

After he had traveled to Syria, Palestine and Egypt in 1845 and 1846, he was appointed assistant professor in Munich in 1846, but was dismissed in 1847, along with seven of his colleagues, as a result of their involvement in opposition to the elevation of Lola Montez, mistress of Ludwig I of Bavaria, to the nobility. Sepp had his teaching qualification withdrawn and was banished from the Bavarian capital.

In 1848, he was elected to the Frankfurt National Assembly, and in 1849 to the Bavarian Chamber of Representatives. In 1850, after the resignation of King Ludwig I of Bavaria, Sepp was rehabilitated, and in 1850–1864 and 1864–1867 was associate professor of history in Munich. In 1861 he bought the partially destroyed Wessobrunn Abbey, which was then being used as a quarry, in order to preserve it for posterity.

Sepp retired suddenly in December 1867 "for personal reasons". He was appointed to the Zollparlament in 1868, and in 1869 again elected to the Bavarian Chamber, where he was one of the most influential representatives of the German national cause during the critical period between 1870 and 1871. In 1872, he undertook a new journey to Palestine on behalf of the new German Empire. In 1874, Sepp went to Tyre, Lebanon to excavate the remains of Frederick Barbarossa buried in a cathedral there, during the reign of German Emperor Wilhelm I.

Sepp was highly literate and a capable publicist. He was sometimes prone to original and idiosyncratic interpretations of history, so was respectfully nicknamed by colleagues "die umgestürzte Bücherkiste" ("the overturned bookcase"). His final major work, his contribution to German folklore, appeared in 1890: "The Religion of the Ancient Germans. Their continued existence in folk tales, processions and festivities to the present". This was a kind of view in hindsight, a compressed, comparative survey of a lifetime of accumulated and processed historical anthropological and religious knowledge; like most of his works, it has not enjoyed a new edition. Still frequently cited today is his study of the myths, legends, customs and manners of Bavaria, the Altbayerischer Sagenschatz of 1876. This work, although heavily compressed and eclectic, attempted an overview of the mythology of Bavaria, with literary references. Sepp also published under the pseudonym "Eusebius Amort der Jüngere".

From the 1830s Sepp belonged to the circle of Joseph Görres in Munich. In 1847, he was also founder of the Akademische Tafelrunde in Munich. While in the Frankfurt National Assembly he belonged to the Catholic Club, and from 1849 to 1856 to the "Society for Constitutional Monarchy and Religious Freedom in Munich", whose spokesman he was at times.

Johann Nepomuk Sepp was buried in the Alter Südfriedhof in Munich. His tombstone has been preserved.

His son, Bernhard Sepp, was also a historian.

Selected works 
 Das Leben Jesu Christi. Regensburg 1842–1846, 7 Bände; 2. Auflage 1853–1862, 6 Bände
 Das Heidenthum und dessen Bedeutung für das Christenthum. Regensburg 1853, 3 Bände
 Thaten und Lehren Jesu mit ihrer weltgeschichtlichen Beglaubigung. Schaffhausen 1864
 Geschichte der Apostel vom Tod Jesu bis zur Zerstörung Jerusalems. 2. Auflage, Schaffhausen 1866
 Das Hebräer-Evangelium oder die Markus- und Matthäus-Frage. Schaffhausen 1870
 Jerusalem und das Heilige Land. Schaffhausen 1862–1863, 2 Bände; 2. Auflage, Regensburg 1872–1876
 Neue architektonische Studien und historisch-topographische Forschungen in Palästina. Würzburg 1867
 Ludwig Augustus, König von Bayern. Schaffhausen 1869
 Deutschland und der Vatikan. Staats- und Volksmännern, sowie Kirchenobern zur ernsten Erwägung. München 1872.
 Altbayerischer Sagenschatz. München 1876
 Görres und seine Zeitgenossen. Nördlingen 1877
 Meerfahrt nach Tyrus zur Ausgrabung der Kathedrale mit Barbarossas Grab. Leipzig 1879
 Ein Volk von zehn Millionen, oder der Bayernstamm. München 1882
 Der bayrische Bauernkrieg mit den Schlachten von Sendling und Aidenbach. München
 Festschrift anläßlich der Enthüllung des Denkmals für Kaspar Winzerer (III) in Bad Tölz. 1887
 Die Religion der alten Deutschen. Ihr Fortbestand in Volkssagen, Aufzügen und Festbräuchen bis zur Gegenwart. München 1890
 Der Schmied von Kochel. Bühnenstücke in 5 Akten, 1898
 Schmiedbalthes. Balthasar Maier im Türkenkriege und der Held in der Sendlinger Bauernschlacht. Gelegentlich der Errichtung seines Monumentes, 1900
 Festschrift zur zweiten Jahrhundertwende der Schlacht bei Sendling. München 1905

Notes and references

Bibliography 
 Dr. Joh. Nepomuk Sepp (1816–1909). Ein Bild seines Lebens nach seinen eigenen Aufzeichnungen. 2 volumes. Regensburg 1917
 Heinrich Best and Wilhelm Weege: Biographisches Handbuch der Abgeordneten der Frankfurter Nationalversammlung 1848/49. Düsseldorf 1996, pp. 317f.
 Meyers Konversations-Lexikon. 4th edition 1888–1890, vol. 14, Verlag des Bibliographischen Instituts, Leipzig and Vienna, p. 869 (online version)
 Monika Fink-Lang: „Dem Geiste nach verpflichtet“. Die Görres-Schüler Johann Nepomuk Sepp und Michael Strodl. In: Helmut Flachenecker und Dietmar Grypa (ed.): Schule, Universität und Bildung. Festschrift für Harald Dickerhof zum 65. Geburtstag. Regensburg 2007, pp. 243–293

External links
 Wikisource: Johann Nepomuk Sepp – Quellen und Volltexte 
 Literature by and about Johann Nepomuk Sepp in the Catalogue of the Deutsche Nationalbibliothek 
 Johann Nepomuk Sepp in the Database of Reichstagsabgeordneten 
 Johann Nepomuk Sepp in the Parliamentary database at the Website of the Haus der Bayerischen Geschichte 
 Biography of Johann Nepomuk Sepp. In: Heinrich Best: Datenbank der Abgeordneten der Reichstage des Kaiserreichs 1867/71 bis 1918 (Biorab – Kaiserreich) (the search term must be entered into the Search function) 

1816 births
1909 deaths
People from Bad Tölz
People from the Kingdom of Bavaria
German Roman Catholics
19th-century German historians
Members of the Frankfurt Parliament
Members of the Bavarian Chamber of Deputies
Ludwig Maximilian University of Munich alumni
Burials at the Alter Südfriedhof
German male non-fiction writers